Magadh University is a public state university and institution of higher education in Bodhgaya, Bihar, India. It is recognised by the University Grants Commission (UGC).

The university is governed by the Bihar State University Act 1976.

It provides facilities for higher learning and research in the faculties of science, social sciences, humanities and commerce. With 19 constituent colleges, 22 PG departments and 39 affiliated colleges, Magadh University is the largest university in Bihar.

After years of discussion and thought, Magadh University was finally split in 2018 and another university i.e. Pataliputra University came into being which covered under its jurisdiction all colleges located within the geographic area of Patna and Nalanda district that were earlier under Magadh University.

Due to division of the university and other associated issues examination of the university were delayed. For this, MULEA CAMPAIGN was launched.

History

Magadh University was established in 1962 by Satyendra Narayan Sinha, an educationist and the then Education Minister of Bihar. K. K. Dutta, a renowned historian, was the founder vice-chancellor. It started functioning on 2 March 1962 with two constituent colleges, 32 affiliated colleges and seven postgraduate departments.

In 1992, 17 constituent colleges were transferred to the newly constituted Veer Kunwar Singh University, Arrah (Bhojpur). 

Several professional/vocational courses like M.B.A., M.C.A., B.C.A., B.B.M. Environmental Science, Tourism & Travel Management, Counseling & Rehabilitation, Journalism & Mass Communication, etc. are being run in constituent/affiliated colleges. There are two government Medical Colleges, two private Engineering Colleges, one private Dental College and three Law colleges under the university. Magadh University also provides distance learning facilities.

Facilities
The university has a multi-storied library, the Mannulal Central Library, besides the department libraries. The central library has about 162,245 books, manuscripts and other reading materials. It has a wide range of ancient and modern literature and books as well as national and international journals.

All the science departments including Psychology and Geography have well-equipped laboratories for teaching and research. Research facilities are available in all the departments. The Science Labs have the modern equipment required for research.

There are eight hostels on campus having accommodation facilities for 1500 students. One girls' hostel is available to accommodate 150 students. The University Health Centre-cum-Dispensary provides medical facilities to students, teachers and other employees residing on and off campus around the clock. It has the services of three doctors, nurses and supporting paramedical staff.

A branch of the Central Bank of India functions on the campus. Likewise, a post office is on campus.

A large sports complex is on the campus for outdoor and indoor games, particularly athletic events.

Magadh University is developing a modern Computer Lab to the requirement of MCA teaching. Besides the facilities for practical work in courses at the university headquarters, the constituent colleges have computer and language labs.

Faculty
150 teachers work in the university departments and more than 2000 teachers are posted in constituent colleges.

Colleges 
Its jurisdiction extends over five districts, Arwal, Aurangabad, Gaya, Jehanabad, and Nawadah .

Affiliated Colleges 
 Sanjay Singh Yadav College, Rafiganj Aurangabad 
Janta College, Aurangabad
K P S College, GAYA	
K P S College, HULASGANJ, JEHANABAD	
K P S College, KINJAR, ARWAL	
M S Y College, KINJER, ARWAL	
MAA Bageshwari College, GAYA	
Magadh Mahavidyalaya, Sakurabad, Jehanabad
S G M College, GAYA	
V S College, BODH GAYA
 Mirza Ghalib College
Mahavir College, GAYA

Constituent Colleges 
 Anugrah Memorial Law college, Gaya, India
 A.N.S College, Nabinagar, Aurangabad
 Daudnagar College, Daudnagar, Aurangabad
 Gautam Buddha Mahila College, Gaya
 Gaya College, Gaya
 Jagjiwan College, Gaya
 K.L.S. College, Nawada
 Kishori Sinha Mahila College, Aurangabad
 Rajendra Memorial Women's College, Nawada
 RLSY College Aurangabad, Aurangabad
 S.B.A.N College, Darhatllari, Arwal
 S.D. College, Kaler, Arwal
 S.M.S.G. College, Sherghati, Gaya
 S.N.S. College, Tekari, GAya
 S.N. Sinha College, Jehanabad, Jehanabad
 S.N.S College, Warisaliganj, NAwada
 S.S. College, Jehanabad, Jehanabad
 Sachchidananda Sinha College, Aurangabad
 T.S. College, Hisua, Nawada
 SPY College, Karpi Arwal
 RCS College Kurtha, Kurtha, Arwal
 R.N.P College Arwal Arwal
 SSSG College Arwal, Arwal
 Fatehpur Sanda College, Fatehpur Sanda, Arwal
 M.S.Y College Kinjer, Kinjer Arwal
 jajba Teachers Training,College Khizersarai

Notable alumni
 Surendra Prasad Yadav
 Pankaj Tripathi
 Giriraj Singh
 Akharul Iman
 Jitan Ram Manjhi
 Mangal Pandey
 Rajiv Pratap Rudy
 Ram Kripal Yadav
 Prem Kumar
 Binod Kumar Roy
 Alok Kumar
 Dr. Jayanti Prabha Sinha
 Gopal Prasad

References

External links
Magadh University, Bodhgaya, Bihar
Gaya College, Gaya
Daudnagar College, Daudnagar, Aurangabad
S S College, Jehanabad

 
1962 establishments in Bihar
Educational institutions established in 1962
Gaya district
Universities in Bihar